Life & Beth is an American comedy-drama series starring Amy Schumer, Violet Young, Michael Cera, Yamaneika Saunders, Michael Rapaport and Susannah Flood. It premiered on Hulu on March 18, 2022. In April 2022, the series was renewed for a ten-episode second season.

Premise
Beth's seemingly ideal life is upended when a sudden incident forces her to engage with her past.

Cast and characters

Main
 Amy Schumer as Beth 
 Violet Young as a young version of Beth
Michael Cera as John
 Susannah Flood as Ann

Recurring
 Yamaneika Saunders as Maya
 Michael Rapaport as Leonard
 Jon Glaser as Gerald
 Kevin Kane as Matt
 Laura Benanti as Jane
 Larry Owens as Clark
 Rosebud Baker as Meri
 LaVar Walker as Lavar
 Gary Gulman as Shlomo
 Murray Hill as Murray

Episodes

Release 
The series premiered with all 10 episodes on March 18, 2022, on Hulu. In international markets, it was later released via the Star content hub on Disney+, on Star+ in Latin America, and on Disney+ Hotstar in Southeast Asia.

Reception

Audience viewership 
According to Whip Media, Life & Beth was the 7th most streamed original series across all platforms, in the United States, during the week of March 27, 2022.

Critical reception 
The review aggregator website Rotten Tomatoes reported a 92% approval rating with an average rating of 7.30/10, based on 38 critic reviews. The website's critics consensus reads, "Beth proves there's still plenty of life left in Amy Schumer's artistic project, boasting the comedian's most nuanced performance yet." Metacritic, which uses a weighted average, assigned a score of 70 out of 100 based on 19 critics, indicating "generally favorable reviews."

Accolades

References

External links 
 

2020s American comedy television series
2020s American comedy-drama television series
2022 American television series debuts
Hulu original programming